Richard Frederick Krell (born July 13, 1992 in London, Ontario) is a Canadian curler from Canmore, Alberta.

Career

University curling
Krell was a member of the Wilfrid Laurier University curling team, winning provincial titles in 2015 and 2016 and a national title in 2016. Krell has played in the 2014, 2015 and 2016 CIS/CCA Curling Championships for Laurier, throwing third stones for Aaron Squires.

Men's
While playing third for Laurier, Krell would also skip his own team on the World Curling Tour. He has been skipping a team on the WCT since 2013. Krell won his first tour event by winning the 2016 KW Fall Classic.

Personal life
Krell graduated from Laurier in 2016 with a degree in Communication Studies. He attended London Central Secondary School in London, Ontario.

References

External links
 

Living people
Wilfrid Laurier University alumni
Sportspeople from London, Ontario
Sportspeople from Kitchener, Ontario
Curlers from Ontario
1992 births
Canadian male curlers
People from Canmore, Alberta
Competitors at the 2017 Winter Universiade